Kaslo is a village in British Columbia, Canada.

Kaslo may also refer to:

Places
 Kaslo (electoral district), a former provincial riding in Canada (1903–1920)
 Kaslo Airport, an airport in Canada
 Kaslo River, a river in Canada

See also

Karlo (name)
 Kaslo-Slocan, a former provincial riding in Canada (1924–1963)
 Nelson-Kaslo, a former provincial riding in Canada (1903–1912)
 Kaslo and Slocan Railway, a former railway in Canada